Squibs M.P. is a 1923 British silent comedy film directed by George Pearson and starring Betty Balfour, Hugh E. Wright and Fred Groves.

Cast
 Betty Balfour as Squibs Hopkins  
 Hugh E. Wright as Sam Hopkins  
 Fred Groves as PC Charlie Lee  
 Irene Tripod as Euphemia Fitzbulge  
 Frank Stanmore as Horace Honeybunn 
 Odette Myrtil as Dancer

References

Bibliography
 Low, Rachael. The History of the British Film 1918-1929. George Allen & Unwin, 1971.

External links
 
 
 Entry of film in Progressive Silent Film List
 Mention of the film in Movie History: A Survey: Second Edition
 Mention of the film in History of British Film (Volume 4): The History of the British Film 1918 - 1929
 Mention of the film in Motion Picture Series and Sequels: A Reference Guide

1923 films
1923 comedy films
British comedy films
British silent feature films
1920s English-language films
Films directed by George Pearson
Films set in London
British black-and-white films
1920s British films
Silent comedy films